Pasimachus is a genus of beetles in the family Carabidae, containing the following species:

 Pasimachus ambiguus Bänninger, 1950
 Pasimachus aurocinctus Chaudoir, 1880
 Pasimachus californicus Chaudoir, 1850
 Pasimachus cardioderus (Chaudoir, 1880)
 Pasimachus cordicollis (Chaudoir, 1862)
 Pasimachus cuestai Kohlmann, 1993
 Pasimachus depressus (Fabricius, 1787)
 Pasimachus duplicatus LeConte, 1853
 Pasimachus elongatus LeConte, 1846
 Pasimachus imitator Bänninger, 1950
 Pasimachus intermedius (Chaudoir, 1880)
 Pasimachus laevisulcatus H. W. Bates, 1891
 Pasimachus marginatus (Fabricius, 1787)
 Pasimachus metallicus (Chaudoir, 1880)
 Pasimachus mexicanus G. R. Gray, 1832
 Pasimachus obsoletus LeConte, 1846
 Pasimachus pacificus Bänninger, 1950
 Pasimachus perpolitus Casey, 1913
 Pasimachus punctulatus Haldeman, 1843
 Pasimachus purpuratus (Putzeys, 1846)
 Pasimachus quadricollis Chaudoir, 1880
 Pasimachus quirozi Flohr, 1887
 Pasimachus rotundipennis Chevrolat, 1834
 Pasimachus sallei Chaudoir, 1862
 Pasimachus sexualis Bänninger, 1950
 Pasimachus smithi H. W. Bates, 1891
 Pasimachus strenuus LeConte, 1874
 Pasimachus subangulatus (Chaudoir, 1862)
 Pasimachus sublaevis (Palisot de Beauvois, 1811)
 Pasimachus subsulcatus Say, 1823
 Pasimachus tolucanus Chaudoir, 1880
 Pasimachus viridans LeConte, 1858

References

Scaritinae
Carabidae genera